is the ninth, Christmas single by Japanese singer-songwriter Gackt, released on december 16, 2001, under Nippon Crown.

Summary
In 2001 Gackt went to visit one of the poorest countries in the world, Madagascar, and afterwards the world was in a state of tension due to September 11 attacks in the New York City, and he was moved and impressed how the children smile in the moment when they're hungry and there's a gap between the rich and the poor worldwide. Gackt decided to write a song for a world peace and love, and to film the video in New York.

The single was first released on December 16, 2001 as a Christmas single, but until 2004, was recorded in four different languages, Japanese, English, Chinese and Korean. In 2005, was re-recorded the Korean version of the song in collaboration with M.C the Max (Isoo), and released as a digital download. The Chinese version of the song was re-recorded in duet with Leehom Wang, and others versions were also re-recorded, and released in the last installment of this single-series, Jūnigatsu no Love Songs ~Complete Box~, box set released on December 13, 2006. On November 27, Gackt appeared and performed the song in Japanese, Korean, and Mandarin language on the grand concert of the "2007 Japan-China Cultural Exchange" in Beijing.

Release

The single in Japanese language, reached number six on the fourth counting week of December 2001, with sales of 56,030 copies. In the upcoming three weeks, one in December and two in January 2002, it was at number five, ten and seventeen, with sales of 48,710, and 41,250, and 9,670 copies. It charted for 9 weeks, and in 2002, with sales of 171,050 copies, was the 73rd best selling single of the year. The English single reached number five on the second counting week of December 2002, with sales of 38,396 copies. In the upcoming week, it was at number sixteen, with sales of 13,269 copies. It charted for 11 weeks, and sold 81,594 copies.

The Chinese single reached number six on the third counting week of December 2003, with sales of 26,997 copies. In the upcoming week, it was at number eighteen, with sales of 8,924 copies. It charted for 8 week, and sold 51,748 copies. The final single in Korean reached number eight, with sales of 22,592 copies. It charted for 7 weeks, and sold 36,767 copies.

Track listing

References

2001 singles
2003 singles
2004 singles
2005 singles
Gackt songs
2001 songs
Songs written by Gackt